The Kibble Literary Awards comprise two awards—the Nita B Kibble Literary Award, which recognises the work of an established Australian female writer, and the Dobbie Literary Award, which is for a first published work by a female writer. The Awards recognise the works of women writers of fiction or non-fiction classified as 'life writing'. This includes novels, autobiographies, biographies, literature and any writing with a strong personal element.

The Kibble Literary Awards were established in 1994 and are named in honour of Nita Kibble (1879–1962), who was the first woman to be a librarian with the State Library of New South Wales. She was Principal Research Librarian from 1919 until her retirement in 1943, and was a founding member of the Australian Institute of Librarians.

The Kibble Awards for Women Writers were established by Nita Dobbie, through her will, in recognition of her aunt, Nita Kibble, who had raised her from birth after her mother died. Miss Dobbie followed her aunt into the library profession. She believed there was a need to foster women’s writing in the community. The awards are currently worth A$35,000 in total.

The Trust established for the award is managed by Perpetual Limited, and the award is administered in association with the State Library of New South Wales.

Both awards were presented annually from their inception until 2016, when they were changed to biennial presentation. In 2020, no awards were presented "due to a review of the funding trust and the award processes."

Nita B Kibble Literary Award honorees

Dobbie Literary Award honorees

See also
 Australian History Awards
 Australian literature
 List of Australian literary awards
 List of literary awards
 National Biography Award

References 

Australian literary awards
Awards established in 1994
Literary awards honoring women
1994 establishments in Australia